These are the official results of the Men's Long Jump event at the 1995 IAAF World Championships in Gothenburg, Sweden. There were a total number of 50 participating athletes, with two qualifying groups. The final was held on Saturday, August 12, 1995. The qualification mark was set at 8.05 metres.

Medalists

Schedule
All times are Central European Time (UTC+1)

Abbreviations
All results shown are in metres

Records

Qualifying round

Final

See also
 1994 Men's European Championships Long Jump
 1995 Long Jump Year Ranking
 1996 Men's Olympic Long Jump
 1998 Men's European Championships Long Jump

References
 Results
 IAAF

L
Long jump at the World Athletics Championships